Guzmania cerrohoyaensis is a flowering plant species from the genus Guzmania.

References

Guzmania